Unknown Brood is a Dutch documentary, directed by Dennis Alink. The film depicts the life of painter and rock-'n-roll musician Herman Brood and premiered at the IDFA in Amsterdam. The film was nominated for Best Dutch Documentary and has been released in cinemas by distributor Amstel Film.

Synopsis
On 11 July 2001, Herman Brood commits suicide by jumping off the roof of the Hilton hotel. In his personal videos, song lyrics and interviews Brood has left a trail of breadcrumbs pertaining to the questions his death has given rise to. The documentary takes a look back to re-experience these important moments with the help of these never-before-seen footages and the people that stood closest to him.

Production
The filmmakers started this project without any budget and it took them four years to make. Before shooting began cinematographer Thomas van der Gronde and director Dennis Alink experimented with a new documentary-approach by writing a 50-page script and a graphic film-plan in which archive and new to shoot scenes would fuse. This way the locations and lighting of interviews would change and develop every other scene to complement the state of mind of Herman Brood. Eventually a small budget was raised through crowdfunding and after the film was edited the Netherlands Film Fund and KPN stepped in so the film could be completed.

Seen in the film
Herman Brood
Frank Black 
Nina Hagen 
Anton Corbijn 
Henny Vrienten 
Jules Deelder 
Dany Lademacher

External links
 
 Official Trailer
 Facebook
 IDFA: Unknown Brood
 Official website
 Review

2016 films
Dutch documentary films
Rockumentaries
Herman Brood
Dutch rock music films